Edmund Armstrong  may refer to:

Sir Edmund Armstrong, 2nd Baronet (1836–1899)
Edmund John Armstrong (1841–1865), Irish poet
Edmund la Touche Armstrong (1864–1946), Australian historian and librarian